Hardangerjøkulen is the sixth largest glacier in mainland Norway. It is located in the municipalities of Eidfjord and Ulvik in Vestland county.

Accessibility
The glacier can be easily accessed by skis from the north in the winter, from the village of Finse, which is only accessible by stopping at Finse Station on the Bergen Line railway.

Recent history
The 1980 movie Star Wars: Episode V – The Empire Strikes Back used Hardangerjøkulen as a filming location, for scenes of the ice planet Hoth, although in the battle scene, miniatures were used on a set that used microscopic glass bubbles and baking soda to mimic the snowy territory.

See also
List of glaciers in Norway
List of highest points of Norwegian counties

References

External links

– Hardangerjøkulen har ikke sett slik ut på 20 år

Glaciers of Vestland
Ulvik
Eidfjord